Patrick Dillon (January 2, 1853 – July 27, 1902) was an American professional catcher who played for the 1875 St. Louis Red Stockings of the National Association. Dillon was born in Saint Louis, Missouri. His brother, John Dillon, also played for the Red Stockings in the same season.

The Red Stockings were an amateur baseball team from Saint Louis that decided to turn professional in 1875. But the Red Stockings survived only part of the season (18 games), as the club played its final game on July 4.

In his only season for St. Louis, Dillon shared catching duties with Silver Flint. He posted a .231 average (3-for-13) in three games, hitting a double and driving in one run while scoring one time.

Dillon died in Mehlville, Missouri, at the age of 49 from heart disease.

Sources

Major League Baseball catchers
St. Louis Red Stockings players
19th-century baseball players
Baseball players from Missouri
1853 births
1902 deaths